Trackmania is a racing video game developed by Ubisoft Nadeo and published by Ubisoft, and is part of the TrackMania series. It was released on July 1, 2020, for Microsoft Windows. A remake of TrackMania Nations, it was given the soft reboot title of Trackmania. The base game is free-to-play, with additional content available with a paid subscription model, including an in-game track editor, online events and car customization. The game is set to be released for consoles and cloud platforms in early 2023.

The game has received mixed to positive reviews, with the gameplay being received positively, and its subscription model being criticized.

Gameplay 
Trackmania is a soft reboot of the Trackmania series, and by extension, a remake of Trackmania Nations. It features gameplay similar to that of previous titles in the series, in which the player must race from start to finish on a selected track in the quickest time possible, with a heavy emphasis on fast-paced stunts and arcade behaviour.

Trackmania features the return of the "Stadium" environment seen in previous entries, however all previously used blocks and track pieces that were seen in previous games have been removed and replaced entirely by a new set of blocks built from scratch. For example, in addition to standard road and dirt surfaces, a new ice surface was introduced, containing flat and bobsleigh-style blocks. The game also features tools that allows players to create their own custom blocks and objects, which in turn can be uploaded and featured in-game for other players to use in their own creations.

Previous games in the series featured a permanent campaign of 65 tracks, however Trackmania replaces this with a seasonal campaign of 25 tracks, which rotates every three months, alongside a permanent "Training" campaign of 25 tracks which remains available to all players, and players with "Standard" or "Club" subscription access receive retroactive, permanent access to past campaigns, however, the leaderboards in these campaigns are locked and will not have any effect on global leaderboards should a player improve their personal best time on any track in a past campaign.

In addition, a "Track Of The Day" campaign is available to players with "Standard" or "Club" subscription access, which features a track that has been made by the community, and hand-selected by the developers to be featured in-game. The selected track rotates every 24 hours.

Content and gameplay updates 
Trackmania has received several updates since its initial release which have added gameplay features.

On November 2, 2020, a "Cup Of The Day" gameplay mode was released in beta, which runs alongside every newly released "Track Of The Day". The mode consists of a daily knockout tournament, where players race against each other on the new "Track Of The Day" in a round-based format. The mode begins with a 15 minute seeding phase in time attack, where players must set the best time they can on a global leaderboard. After this phase, players are then matched together in divisions of 64 players each to begin the knockout phase. At the end of every round, players who have finished in the bottom positions, or who have failed to finish, are eliminated. The process repeats until only one player remains, who is crowned as the winner. The gameplay mode has been positively received, with players citing its fun factor and replay value. The "Cup Of The Day" mode was fully released on December 12, 2020.

On 4 February 2021, a matchmaking gameplay mode was released in beta. It features two teams of players racing against each other on a randomly selected track on the current seasonal campaign, with the goal being for each team to finish in as high a position as they possibly can on each round. Each position attributes a certain number of points to a players' team. At the end of each round, the team with the most points wins the round; the first team to win 5 rounds wins the match. The mode also features a ranking ladder, which players can move up or down depending on wins and losses in a match. Matchmaking was positively received by players, although some have criticized the decision for a 1v1 option to have not been implemented. Matchmaking was fully released on 1 June 2021, and was renamed to Ranked.

On 12 June 2021, Nadeo announced the release of the "Royal" gameplay mode, as well as several new blocksets, including plastic blocks, the return of water blocks and fully animated & dynamic blocks.

In addition to official updates, the game features tools that allows players and content creators to create and organize community events and tournaments in-game. Some of the most popular events include the ZrT TrackMania Cup, TrackMania Formula League, and the TrackMania Grand League, an official tournament organised and endorsed by Nadeo, the developers of the game.

On 1 October 2022, Nadeo updated the game changing how ice and water physics will work. Prior to the update you were able to limit steering to 35-40% (action key 2). This update intended making full steer the fastest, but players found out the fastest way is limiting steering to 80% (action key 4). The update changed how ice wiggles worked, you used to be able to slightly turn left and right over and over gaining speed. Now you have to tap left and right while trying not to get a penalized. Water bounces have also been fixed, the only way to gain speed is bouncing on the edge of plastic.

Reception 

Trackmania received an aggregate score of 74/100 on Metacritic.

Benjamin Schmädig of 4Players rated the game 85/100, praising its time trials and track editor.

Alex Santa Maria of IGN rated the game 7/10, saying that it was "addictive" and had a robust amount of content, but criticized its menus as looking "cobbled-together". He also criticized the idea of "gating off access" through a subscription model, saying that it risked hindering the game's long-term community support.

Gianluca Musso of Eurogamer Italia also rated the game 7/10, saying that while it was beautiful and fun, he criticized the fact that it was aimed solely at the hardcore audience.

The game was initially criticized by players due to unstable servers and unoptimized netcode, however these issues have been resolved over time via patches and updates.

References

External links 
 

2020 video games
Multiplayer and single-player video games
Racing video games
TrackMania
Ubisoft games
Video games developed in France
Video game remakes
Video game sequels
Windows games
Windows-only games